Leaders Not Followers is an EP album by the British band Napalm Death, featuring covers from various punk and metal bands. The EP has been re-issued by Secret Records on limited edition red vinyl on the occasion of Record Store Day 2013 and has also been included on their CD re-issue of Enemy of the Music Business as bonus tracks.

Track listing

See also
Leaders Not Followers: Part 2

Personnel

Napalm Death
 Mark "Barney" Greenway – vocals
 Jesse Pintado – lead guitar
 Mitch Harris – rhythm guitar
 Shane Embury – bass
 Danny Herrera – drums

Technical personnel
 Simon Efemey – production, engineering
 Russ Russell – production, engineering
 Mid – photo images

References

1999 EPs
Covers EPs
Napalm Death EPs